Gerry Lester "Bubba" Watson Jr. (born November 5, 1978) is an American professional golfer. He has two major championships, with victories at the Masters Tournament in 2012 and 2014, and a total 12 PGA Tour wins. In February 2015, Watson reached a career-high 2nd place in the Official World Golf Ranking. Watson plays in the LIV Golf since 2022.

He has finished top of the driving distance statistics five times, during the 2006, 2007, 2008, 2012, and 2014 seasons.

Amateur career
Watson was born and raised in Bagdad, Florida, near Pensacola. He played on the golf team at Milton High School, just after future PGA Tour members Heath Slocum and Boo Weekley. Watson played golf for Faulkner State Community College in nearby Baldwin County, Alabama, where he was a junior college All-American. He transferred to the University of Georgia, the defending NCAA champions, and played for the Bulldogs in 2000 and 2001. As a junior, Watson helped lead the Bulldogs to the SEC title in 2000.

Professional career
Watson turned professional in 2002 and joined the Nationwide Tour, where he played until 2005. He finished 21st on the Nationwide Tour's money list in 2005, making him the last player to qualify for the following year's PGA Tour.

Watson played well at the 2007 U.S. Open. He was in the final group on Saturday after shooting rounds of 70-71 (+1) at Oakmont Country Club near Pittsburgh. Watson was one stroke off the lead after 36 holes but then slipped, shooting 74 (+4) in both the third and fourth rounds; he finished in a tie for fifth.

2010
Watson claimed his first PGA Tour win on June 27, 2010, in Cromwell, Connecticut, at the Travelers Championship on the second hole of a sudden-death playoff with Corey Pavin and Scott Verplank. Watson tearfully dedicated the win to his parents, specifically his father who was battling cancer.

Watson was runner-up to Martin Kaymer at the PGA Championship at Whistling Straits, falling in the three-hole aggregate playoff that included Dustin Johnson until he incurred a two-stroke penalty on the 72nd hole. Watson led the playoff after a birdie on the first hole, but Kaymer birdied the par-3 second hole to tie, effectively turning the playoff into sudden-death. Watson's second shot found the water hazard and Kaymer bested him by a stroke to win the major championship.

Watson had his own clothing line called "Bubba Golf" at the former Steve & Barry's. He was invited on The Ellen DeGeneres Show after he sent her a video of a golf trick shot he completed for her birthday.

2011
On January 30, 2011, Watson won his second PGA Tour event, the Farmers Insurance Open, finishing one stroke ahead of runner-up Phil Mickelson. Watson picked up his second win of the 2011 season and third career PGA Tour title on May 1 when he defeated Webb Simpson at the second playoff hole at the Zurich Classic of New Orleans. Both players birdied the first playoff hole, with Watson holing a 12-footer; he birdied the next hole to win the tournament.

In July 2011, Watson provoked controversy by criticizing the Alstom Open de France on the European Tour, in which he was playing under a sponsor's exemption. He indicated after his first round that he would not be playing any further events on the European Tour, and complained after his second round about security and organization at the tournament.

Watson took part in the Long Drive Contest for charity at the Hyundai Tournament of Champions alongside Dustin Johnson and Robert Garrigus.

2012

Watson began the year with three top-5 finishes in seven events, including finishing second at the WGC-Cadillac Championship.

Masters win
Watson's first major championship win came at the Masters. He began the final round at six-under-par, three strokes off the lead, held by Peter Hanson. On the back nine, Watson bogeyed the par-3 12th hole to return to even par for the round. He then recorded four consecutive birdies for a round of 68 (-4) and tied for the 72-hole lead with fourth-round playing partner Louis Oosthuizen at ten-under-par. In the sudden-death playoff, Oosthuizen and Watson both made par on the uphill 18th hole. On the next hole, the downhill 10th, both drove their tee shots towards the woods to the right of the hole. Watson executed a miraculous recovery shot with 40 yards of hook on his 52-degree gap wedge and stopped the ball within fifteen feet of the hole. Oosthuizen's approach shot landed short of the green, but he chipped past the hole and narrowly missed his lengthy putt for par. Watson trickled his birdie putt a foot past the hole, took his time on the very short par putt, then made it for the emotional victory. The win took him to a world ranking of four, a career-high at the time.

Rest of 2012
Following his Masters win, Watson began to struggle. He missed the cut at the Memorial Tournament and the U.S. Open. A week after the U.S. Open, he finished tied for second at the Travelers Championship. A month later, he played Open Championship, the third major of the year. While shooting a first round of −3 to tie him at third place, he never advanced much after that, finishing tied for 23rd place. In the final major of the year, the PGA Championship, Watson tied for 11th. He finished the year with one win, six top-5 finishes, seven top-10 finishes and three missed cuts.

2013
Watson began the season playing the Hyundai Tournament of Champions, where he finished tied for fourth place, and reached the quarterfinals in the WGC-Accenture Match Play Championship. In the subsequent World Golf Championship event, the WGC-Cadillac Championship, he began very strong with rounds of 66 and 69, but finished with rounds of 71 and 75 and tied for 18th place.

After finishing tied 14th place in the Arnold Palmer Invitational, he returned to the Masters as the defending champion. Never in contention in the tournament, he finished 50th after a final round of 77. Watson tied for 37th at The Players Championship. On the second major of the year, the U.S. Open, he finished with a solid 71 in the first round, just four shots off the lead, but a second round score of 76 left him out of contention, and he tied for 32nd. At the Travelers Championship he took the lead after a second round of 67, but in the final round, leading by one with three to play, he triple-bogeyed the par-3 16th and finished two shots back in 4th place.

Tying for 30th at the Greenbrier Classic, he then played in the third major of the year, The Open Championship. After two solid rounds of 70 and 73, he shot 77 in the third round, and tied for 32nd.

2014
At the Waste Management Phoenix Open, Watson held the lead for most of the tournament, but he finished runner-up to Kevin Stadler.
 
Watson earned his fifth career PGA Tour victory—and his first since the 2012 Masters—at the 2014 Northern Trust Open at Riviera Country Club. He shot back-to-back 64s over the weekend to defeat runner-up Dustin Johnson by two strokes. The victory raised him to 14 in the Official World Golf Ranking. He followed that win with two more strong finishes—a ninth-place tie in the WGC-Accenture Match Play Championship and a second-place tie in the WGC-Cadillac Championship. Those performances elevated him from 14 to 12 in the world ranking.

Second Masters win
Watson won the Masters by three shots, with a score of 280 (−8). He entered the final round tied for the lead with 20-year-old Masters rookie Jordan Spieth. Playing together in the final pairing, Spieth birdied the seventh hole for a two-stroke lead over Watson. However, the momentum turned on the par-5 eighth hole. Spieth had a birdie putt, but ended up three-putting for bogey while Watson birdied to pull into a first-place tie. Then, on the ninth hole, Watson birdied again while Spieth bogeyed, and the four-shot swing over two holes gave Watson a lead that he never relinquished in a win over Spieth and Jonas Blixt. With the win, Watson became the 17th player to win the Masters two or more times. The win moved him again to number four in the Official World Golf Ranking.

2015
Watson won the Travelers Championship to move him to third in the Official World Golf Ranking.  He garnered his second victory in 2015 by winning the unofficial Hero World Challenge in the Bahamas, besting fellow American Patrick Reed by three strokes.

2016
Prior to the Waste Management Phoenix Open in early February, Watson caused a bit of controversy after publicly admitting his dislike for the course, TPC Scottsdale. As a result, he was jeered by fans for the majority of the tournament, later criticizing the media for "turning his words around". Two weeks later though, he returned to the winner's circle after winning the Northern Trust Open at Riviera for a second time in three years, seeing off the challenge of Adam Scott and Jason Kokrak to win by one shot on 15-under-par.

2017
Watson did not chalk a win during the 2017 season, and missed the cut at three of the year's four majors (his only cut a T27 at The Open Championship). He had five top-10 finishes with more than $1.3 million in tour earnings.

2018
The 2018 season started with a T7 at the QBE Shootout in December 2017 marking the best of his first six starts. Watson returned to the winner's circle with a 12-under finish at the Genesis Open in February, his third victory at this tournament (2014, 2016), all at Riviera. His trifecta at the Genesis (previously known as the Los Angeles Open, Northern Trust Open, and Nissan Open) makes him only the fifth to win this long-standing event at least three times, along with Ben Hogan, Arnold Palmer, Lloyd Mangrum, and Macdonald Smith. On March 25, he gained his eleventh tour win at the WGC-Dell Match Play event in Austin, Texas, with a winner's share of $1.7 million. On June 24, 2018, he won again at the Travelers Championship winning $1.26 million at TPC River Highlands. This was his third career victory at the Travelers tournament (2010, 2015).

In September 2018, Watson qualified for the U.S. team participating in the 2018 Ryder Cup. Europe defeated the U.S. team 17 1/2 to 10 1/2. Watson went 1–2–0. He lost his singles match against Henrik Stenson.

2022
On July 29, 2022, Watson announced that he had joined LIV Golf as a non-playing team captain for the remainder of the season while he recovered from a torn meniscus, with the intention of returning to play from 2023. On August 10, he announced that he had resigned from the PGA Tour.

Personal life
Watson was nicknamed by his father after the former professional American football player Bubba Smith. Watson is married to Angela "Angie" Watson (née Ball), a  Canadian whom he met at Georgia while he was on the golf team and she was on the women's basketball team. They were married in September 2004. In 2009, she was diagnosed with an enlarged pituitary gland, which accounts for her height.

Unable to have a child naturally, various family issues, including the illness and death of Watson's father in 2010, kept them from attempting to adopt until 2011–12. In March 2012, one week after a potential adoption fell through at the last moment, Watson and his wife adopted a one-month-old baby boy named Caleb. In late 2014 the Watsons adopted a baby girl.

Watson's father, Gerry Sr., died on October 15, 2010, of throat cancer. His mother is Molly Marie Watson and he has a sister, Melinda Watson Conner.

Watson is also a member of the "Golf Boys", a boy band consisting of Watson, Ben Crane, Rickie Fowler, and Hunter Mahan. Their single "Oh Oh Oh" is currently on YouTube. The video was produced by Farmers Insurance Group. Farmers donates $1000 to charity for every 100,000 views the video gets.

In 2011, he made a humorous appearance in the song "Michael Jackson" by Christian hip hop artist Andy Mineo on the album Formerly Known. He was featured in the song "Ima Just Do It" by KB, another Christian hip hop artist, on the album Tomorrow We Live. His prototype Golf Cart Hovercraft, the BW1, YouTube video has earned more than 8 million views.

Watson is a committed Christian who speaks openly about the importance of faith in his life.

Watson purchased the mansion in the Isleworth community of Windermere, Florida, that was previously owned by Tiger Woods. In 2013, he was added to the list of Great Floridians by Governor Rick Scott.

Watson purchased a General Lee car from the television series The Dukes of Hazzard at auction for $110,000 in 2012. Following the Charleston church shooting in June 2015, display of the Confederate flag - which is featured on the car's roof - became the subject of renewed controversy. Watson responded by saying he would paint over the flag with the American flag.

In 2015, Watson moved to Pensacola, where he has become very involved in the community. Among other ventures, Watson opened an ice cream store, purchased a part ownership in the Pensacola Blue Wahoos Minor League Baseball team, and purchased a Chevrolet dealership in nearby Milton, Florida. Watson has made significant  donations to the Studer Family Children's Hospital in Pensacola. In 2016, he announced that he plans to run for mayor of Pensacola at some future date.

Professional wins (14)

PGA Tour wins (12)

PGA Tour playoff record (5–1)

Other wins (2)

*Note: The 2008 CVS Caremark Charity Classic was stopped after 28 holes due to heavy rain.

Other playoff record (1–1)

Playoff record
PGA Tour of Australasia playoff record (0–1)

Nationwide Tour playoff record (0–1)

Major championships

Wins (2)

1Defeated Louis Oosthuizen in a sudden-death playoff: Watson (4-4), Oosthuizen (4-5).

Results timeline
Results not in chronological order in 2020.

CUT = missed the half-way cut
T = tied
NT = No tournament due to COVID-19 pandemic

Summary

Most consecutive cuts made – 9 (2019 Open – 2022 PGA, current)
Longest streak of top-10s – 1 (five times)

Results in The Players Championship

CUT = missed the halfway cut
"T" indicates a tie for a place
C = Canceled after the first round due to the COVID-19 pandemic

World Golf Championships

Wins (2)

Results timeline
Results not in chronological order before 2015.

1Cancelled due to COVID-19 pandemic

QF, R16, R32, R64 = Round in which player lost in match play
NT = no tournament
"T" = tied
Note that the Championship and Invitational were discontinued from 2022.

PGA Tour career summary

* As of the 2020 season

U.S. national team appearances
Professional
Wendy's 3-Tour Challenge (representing PGA Tour): 2007, 2009, 2010 (winners)
Ryder Cup: 2010, 2012, 2014, 2018
Presidents Cup: 2011 (winners), 2015 (winners)

See also
2005 Nationwide Tour graduates

References

External links

Watson launches apparel line 'bubbagolf' – July 10, 2007

American male golfers
Georgia Bulldogs men's golfers
PGA Tour golfers
LIV Golf players
Ryder Cup competitors for the United States
Winners of men's major golf championships
Olympic golfers of the United States
Golfers at the 2016 Summer Olympics
Korn Ferry Tour graduates
Golf writers and broadcasters
Golfers from Florida
Left-handed golfers
American Christians
Milton High School (Florida) alumni
Faulkner State Community College alumni
People from Santa Rosa County, Florida
1978 births
Living people